Erling Ozer Schild (עוזר שילד; September 25, 1930 – 2006), a Danish-born Israeli academic, was president of the University of Haifa and president of the College of Judea and Samaria, known as "Ariel College".

Biography
Schild was born in Copenhagen, Denmark. He identified as an Orthodox Jew before the Holocaust, and was not affiliated after the WWII. During the Holocaust he went into hiding under a false identity in Copenhagen, and in Saunte, Denmark.

He completed a master's degree in economics in the University of Copenhagen in 1957, and then made aliyah and immigrated to Israel that year. In 1965, he received a doctorate in psychology and sociology from the Hebrew University of Jerusalem. After post-doctoral work at Johns Hopkins University in Baltimore, Maryland, he returned in 1968 to Israel to head the Psychology Department at Hebrew University.

Together with Daniel Kahneman, Schild volunteered to assist the Israel Air Force Flight Academy in improving its selection and training procedures. In 1973, he moved to Be'er Sheva to serve as Dean of the Humanities Department at Ben-Gurion University of the Negev. In 1974, he was appointed Chief Scientist of the Israel Education Ministry.

In 1976, Schild moved to the University of Haifa to head the School of Education. In 1978 he was appointed rector of the university.

Schild was appointed president of the University of Haifa in 1990.

In October 1993, Schild, with another four-year term ahead of him, resigned from the University of Haifa presidency and moved from Haifa to Ariel. At the College of Judea and Samaria, known as "Ariel College," Schild taught statistics and research methods. He later became president of the college there.

He and his wife had two children.

References 

University of Copenhagen alumni
Academic staff of the University of Haifa
Academic staff of Ben-Gurion University of the Negev
Presidents of universities in Israel
Danish emigrants to Israel
2006 deaths
Hebrew University of Jerusalem alumni
Academic staff of Ariel University
Danish Holocaust survivors
Israeli settlers
People from Haifa
People from Copenhagen
1930 births